The 2009–10 Faithwear Metbank One-Day Competition was a List A cricket competition held in Zimbabwe from 19 September 2009 – 10 April 2010. It was the first edition of the tournament held after a reorganization of Zimbabwean cricket, and saw the previous five teams replaced with five franchises: Mashonaland Eagles, Matabeleland Tuskers, Mid West Rhinos, Mountaineers and Southern Rocks.

It was won by the Mountaineers, who defeated the Mid West Rhinos in the final by three wickets.

Fixtures and results

Group stage

Knockout stage

Semi-finals

Final

References

Faithwear Metbank One-day Competition, 2009-10
Faithwear Metbank One-Day Competition
Pro50 Championship